Greendell is one of three original railway stations built by the Delaware, Lackawanna & Western Railroad (DL&W) along its Lackawanna Cut-Off line in northwestern New Jersey. The station, which still stands in Green Township at milepost 57.6 on the Cut-Off, began operations on December 23, 1911, one day before the line itself opened and the first revenue train arrived.

Contractor Walter H. Gahagan built both the station building and its signal tower, called "GD tower" after its telegraph call letters. The facility controlled a somewhat elaborate  siding with multiple switching points, built to accommodate freight traffic on the railroad's double-track main line. Located about midway between Slateford Junction and Port Morris Junction and a few miles east of the ruling grade on the Cut-Off, the siding allowed slow freights to pull off the main line and wait for faster trains to pass.

Initially called Greensville, the station was renamed Greendell in October, 1916. As time went on, its modest passenger patronage relegated the station to a mere flag stop: most trains skipped it and stopped at Blairstown station on the Cut-Off instead. Finally, the station closed in 1938.

The Lackawanna vied for Green Township's freight business (mostly related to farming and agriculture), with the Lehigh & Hudson River Railway, which had arrived some three decades earlier. As business declined during the 1930s, the tower was closed — either on January 8, 1932 or March 10, 1935; company records conflict — and its functions transferred to Port Morris Tower. Greendell, however, would continue to serve freight customers right up to the end of rail service on the Cut-Off.

In anticipation of the 1960 merger with the Erie Railroad, the Lackawanna single-tracked the Cut-Off in 1958, but retained the siding to keep some operational flexibility. In the mid-1960s, as fewer and fewer trains were being run over the Cut-Off by the Erie Lackawanna, Greendell Siding was cut to about 1.5 miles (2.4 km): about the length of the longest freight trains being run at the time. January 6, 1970 saw the end of passenger service, but a revival of freight traffic on the Cut-Off, and Greendell Siding survived until Conrail finally ended rail service on the Cut-Off in late 1978.  The final freight shipment to a customer on the Cut-Off was delivered by Conrail to Greendell.  The tracks were removed from the Cut-Off by Conrail in 1984.

As of 2017, the station building has been secured.  The Lackawanna Cutoff Historical Committee, a New Jersey-based historical group, is raising funds to restore the station building and surrounding site.

Service along the Cut-Off is being partially restored, with NJ Transit service from Andover to New York City projected to start by about 2025. Greendell has been proposed as the location of a signal maintenance facility for the line if rail service is further extended into Pennsylvania.

See also
Operating Passenger Railroad Stations Thematic Resource (New Jersey)
List of NJ Transit railroad stations

References 

Lackawanna Cut-Off
Former Delaware, Lackawanna and Western Railroad stations
Railway stations in the United States opened in 1911
Railway stations closed in 1938
Proposed public transportation in New Jersey
1911 establishments in New Jersey
1938 disestablishments in New Jersey